Everyone Should Be Killed is the debut full-length studio album by American grindcore band Anal Cunt, released by Earache Records on May 24, 1994. It was the only studio album the band recorded with Fred Ordonez on guitar, as he was dismissed from the band during the recording of the album. Seth Putnam was the second guitar player on the songs recorded after Ordonez was dismissed. He went on to record guitar overdubs on every Earache album with the exception of Top 40 Hits and It Just Gets Worse.

Track listing

Personnel

Musicians
Tim Morse - drums
Fred Ordonez - guitar (tracks: 8, 16, 31, 35, 40, 46, 51, 57)
John Kozik - guitar (tracks: 1 to 7, 9 to 15, 17 to 30, 32 to 34, 36 to 39, 41 to 45, 47 to 50, 52 to 56, 58)
Seth Putnam - vocals, guitar

Additional personnel
Tina Morrisey – production
Bruce Freisinger – production
Yasuhiro Koketsu – photography
Rob Williams – On album cover
Chris Joyce – On album cover

References

Anal Cunt albums
1994 debut albums
Earache Records albums